Latvia competed at the 2020 Summer Olympics in Tokyo. Originally scheduled to take place from 24 July to 9 August 2020, the Games were postponed to 23 July to 8 August 2021, because of the COVID-19 pandemic. It was the nation's eighth consecutive appearance at the Games and twelfth overall in Summer Olympic history.

After finishing with no medals five years ago, Latvia won two medals in Tokyo, with one of them being gold in the Men's 3x3 Basketball Tournament, their first ever medal won at this sport. They are also the leaders of the medal table together with the  USA respectively.

Competitors
The following is the list of number of competitors in the Games.

Athletics

Latvian athletes further achieved the entry standards, either by qualifying time or by world ranking, in the following track and field events (up to a maximum of 3 athletes in each event):

Track & road events

Field events

Basketball

Summary

3×3 basketball

Men's tournament

Latvia men's national 3x3 team qualified for the Games by winning a bronze medal at the 2021 FIBA Olympic Qualifying Tournament.

Team roster
The players were announced on 6 July 2021.

 Agnis Čavars
 Edgars Krūmiņš
 Kārlis Lasmanis
 Nauris Miezis

Group play

Quarterfinal

Semifinal

Gold medal match

Canoeing

Sprint
Latvia qualified a single boat (men's K-1 200 m) for the Games with a top-two finish at the 2021 European Canoe Sprint Qualification Regatta in Szeged, Hungary.

Qualification Legend: FA = Qualify to final (medal); FB = Qualify to final B (non-medal)

Cycling

Road
Latvia entered two riders to compete in the men's Olympic road race, by virtue of their top 32 national finish (for men) in the UCI World Ranking.

BMX
Latvia received two quota places (one per gender) for BMX at the Olympics by topping the field of nations vying for qualification in the men's race at the 2019 UCI BMX World Championships and by finishing among the top three nations for women in the UCI BMX Individual Ranking List of June 1, 2021.

Race

Equestrian

Latvia entered one jumping rider into the Olympic competition by finishing in the top two, outside the group selection, of the individual FEI Olympic Rankings for Group C (Central and Eastern Europe), marking the country's debut in the sport.

Jumping

Judo

Latvia qualified one judoka for the men's half-heavyweight category (100 kg) at the Games. Two-time Olympian Jevgeņijs Borodavko accepted a continental berth from the European zone as the nation's top-ranked judoka outside of direct qualifying position in the IJF World Ranking List of June 28, 2021.

Karate
 
Latvia entered one karateka into the inaugural Olympic tournament. 2019 European Games champion Kalvis Kalniņš secured a place in the men's kumite 67-kg category, as the highest-ranked karateka vying for qualification from the European zone based on the WKD Olympic Rankings.

Kumite

Modern pentathlon
 
Latvia entered one modern pentathlete into the Olympic competition. Pāvels Švecovs finished last of the top eight modern pentathletes vying for qualification in the men's event based on the UIPM World Rankings of June 1, 2021.

Shooting

Latvia granted an invitation from ISSF to send 2014 Youth Olympic bronze medalist Agate Rašmane (women's 25 m pistol) to the rescheduled Games as the highest-ranked shooter vying for qualification in the ISSF World Olympic Rankings of 6 June 2021.

Swimming

Latvia received a universality invitation from FINA to send two top-ranked swimmers (one per gender) in their respective individual events to the Olympics, based on the FINA Points System of June 28, 2021.

Tennis

Latvia entered two tennis players into the Olympic tournament. Rio 2016 Olympian Jeļena Ostapenko (world no. 43) and rookie Anastasija Sevastova (world no. 57) qualified directly among the top 56 eligible players for the women's singles based on the WTA World Rankings of June 13, 2021.

Volleyball

Beach
Latvia men's and women's beach volleyball pairs qualified for the Games by advancing to the final match and securing an outright berth at the 2019 FIVB World Olympic Qualifying Tournament in Haiyang, China.

Weightlifting

Latvia entered two weightlifters into the Olympic competition. 2018 junior world champion Ritvars Suharevs (men's 81 kg) and two-time Olympian Artūrs Plēsnieks (men's 109 kg) secured one of the top eight slots each in their respective weight divisions based on the IWF Absolute World Rankings.

Wrestling

Latvia qualified one wrestler for the women's freestyle 62 kg into the Olympic competition, by progressing to the top two finals at the 2021 European Qualification Tournament in Budapest, Hungary.

Freestyle

See also
Latvia at the 2020 Summer Paralympics

References

External links 

Nations at the 2020 Summer Olympics
2020
2021 in Latvian sport